London Early Opera (LEO) is a British period-instrument orchestra consisting of specialist baroque instrumentalists, singers, researchers, historians and musicologists. LEO was founded in 2008 by Artistic Director Bridget Cunningham as a research-led group. The orchestra is based in London and the south-east of England and became a UK Charity in 2011 (charity no 1143989).

Research & Education 
London Early Opera undertakes musicological research into baroque music and historical performance practice, working with historians, scholars and editors including Bridget Cunningham David E. Coke, Lars Tharp and Professor Michael Talbot. The orchestra performs and records well-known baroque music as well as newly discovered historical works to preserve musical heritage. The group also creates new scholarly editions of previously lost musical works, specialising in the music of George Frideric Handel, Johann Adolf Hasse and their contemporaries. In 2021 the group edited and recorded their reconstruction of Handel’s Caio Fabbricio HWV A9 and have also edited a selection of Handel’s music originally performed in Vauxhall, London, Germany, Italy.

LEO also operates an educational scheme and chamber ensemble, The Handelians, which focuses on the development and education of singers and musicians, and nurtures them in the baroque style.

Performing 

LEO has performed at venues including Coram’s Fields; the Foundling Museum; St James’s Church, Piccadilly; St George’s Church, Hanover Square; the Handel Hendrix Museum; St. Peter’s Church, Vauxhall; Grosvenor Chapel; and a 400th Anniversary Concert of the Monteverdi Vespers at Southwark Cathedral. The orchestra has performed at the London Handel Festival and also tours outside of the UK.

In 2017 LEO performed Handel’s Water Music and a new world-premiere performance of River written by a previous winner of BBC Young Composer of the Year, Grace-Evangeline Mason. This was commissioned by the BBC and performed live by London Early Opera for BBC Radio 4 on the Eras`mus Boat on the River Thames celebrating the 300th Anniversary of Handel's Water Music. In 2022 LEO launched their recording of Handel’s Caio Fabbricio with a world premiere first performance in modern times at St George’s Church, Hanover Square, edited and directed by Bridget Cunningham. LEO have also given several performances on BBC Radio 3.

Recording 
In 2015, LEO began a series of recording projects with Signum Records, capturing world premiere recordings exploring Handel’s life, influences and experiences. The series includes the albums Caio Fabbricio, Handel in Italy, Handel in Ireland, Handel at Vauxhall and Handel’s Eight Great Harpsichord Suites. Handel’s Queens was shortlisted for a 2020 Gramophone Award nomination.

References

External Links 

 London Early Opera official website
 London Early Opera Archives - Signum Records
Final Note Magazine interview with Bridget Cunningham
Thoroughly Good podcast interview with Bridget Cunningham by Jon Jacob, discussing London Handel Festival performances

Baroque music groups
British orchestras
Musical groups established in 2008